William Raymond Williams (born 30 December 1930) is an English former professional footballer who played for Tranmere Rovers.

References

1930 births
Possibly living people
People from Bebington
Association football wing halves
English footballers
Tranmere Rovers F.C. players
Ramblers F.C. players
English Football League players
English expatriate footballers
Expatriate footballers in Namibia